Ashurbeyli (Azerbaijani: Aşurbəyli; Russian: Ашурбейли) is a gender-neutral Azerbaijani surname that may refer to
Igor Ashurbeyli (born 1963), Russian scientist and businessman
Sara Ashurbeyli (1906–2001), Azerbaijani historian, orientalist and scholar

See also
Ashurbeyov

Azerbaijani-language surnames